Neales Flat is a rural locality southeast of Eudunda in the Mid North region in South Australia. It is in the Regional Council of Goyder local government area, the South Australian House of Assembly electoral district of Stuart and the Australian House of Representatives Division of Grey.

Nomenclature 
The District of Neales was named in honour of John Bentham Neales, a politician regarded as the "Father of Mining" in South Australia.

History
Neales Flat once had three Lutheran churches. They have combined and only one congregation continues, and combines services with the church at nearby Peep Hill. It is now part of the "Eudunda Robertstown Lutheran Parish", which includes Lutheran churches at Robertstown, Point Pass, Geranium Plains, Eudunda, Neales Flat and Peep Hill.

The first Lutheran people in the district were from the Immannuel Synod and met in homes from 1871, building St Stephan's Lutheran Church in 1874. The congregation of St Paul built its own building a few kilometres further west, also in 1874, followed by a larger building next door (north side) in 1893 with the original building used as a school. The school became a government school in 1917 and closed in 1942. The school building was used by the St John's congregation from 1894 until that congregation built its own building in 1912 immediately south of the school. With union of the Synods in 1967, St John's and St Paul's combined in the St Paul's building as Trinity Lutheran Church. In 2009, St Stephan's merged with Trinity and formed Neales Flat Lutheran Church, meeting in the reconsecrated St John's building.  A single cemetery lies behind these two church buildings. A separate cemetery is near St Stephan's church, which has been sold.

References

Towns in South Australia